Orobanche californica, known by the common name California broomrape, is a species of broomrape. It is a parasitic plant growing attached to the roots of other plants, usually members of the Asteraceae.

Distribution
Orobanche californica is native to western North America from British Columbia and Idaho, through California and Nevada, to Baja California. It is found in many types of habitats. It has been noted to be associated with California goldenrod (Solidago californica) and sagebrush (Artemisia tridentata).

Description
This plant arises from a thick root and grows erect to a maximum height near , with one stem or a cluster of several. As a parasite taking its nutrients from a host plant, it lacks leaves and chlorophyll. It is light to dark purple in color and coated with glandular hairs.

The inflorescence is an elongated or branching array of several flowers. Each flower is tubular, up to 5 centimeters long, and pale pink, yellowish, or purple in color, sometimes with stark veining. The fruit is a capsule containing minute seeds.

Subspecies
There are several subspecies, which are sometimes difficult to differentiate. They include:
Orobanche californica ssp. californica — native to coastal habitats, central California to B.C., parasitizes Grindelia 
Orobanche californica subsp. condensa  — endemic to California, in the Southern California Coast Ranges and western Transverse Ranges.
Orobanche californica ssp. feudgei — grows on chaparral plants, native to dry areas in Sierra Nevada and Transverse Ranges in California, and Peninsular Ranges in southern California and northern Baja California.
Orobanche californica ssp. grandis — uncommon subspecies endemic to California, found in coastal areas of San Luis Obispo County and northern Santa Barbara County, and on Santa Rosa Island of the northern Channel Islands.
Orobanche californica ssp. grayana — native to moist meadows/stream banks in the San Francisco Bay Area, northern Sierra Nevada, and Modoc Plateau; on Erigeron and Aster 
Orobanche californica ssp. jepsonii — Jepson's broomrape, Jepson's california broom rape, uncommon below , native from southern Sierra/San Joaquin Valley/ Santa Barbara County, north to Oregon border; found on assorted Asteraceae.

Uses
The Paiute people of eastern California and the Great Basin used a decoction as a cold remedy and pulmonary aid.

References

External links

Calflora Database: Orobanche californica (California broomrape,  California orobanche)
Jepson Manual eFlora (TJM2) treatment of Orobanche californica
USDA Plants Profile: Orobanche californica (California broomrape)
UC CalPhotos gallery − Orobanche californica

californica
Parasitic plants
Flora of California
Flora of Baja California
Flora of British Columbia
Flora of Idaho
Flora of Nevada
Flora of Oregon
Flora of Washington (state)
Flora of the Sierra Nevada (United States)
Natural history of the California chaparral and woodlands
Natural history of the California Coast Ranges
Natural history of the Peninsular Ranges
Natural history of the Transverse Ranges
Plants used in traditional Native American medicine
Least concern biota of Mexico
Least concern flora of the United States